Olearia frostii, commonly known as Bogong daisy-bush, is a species of flowering plant in the family Asteraceae and is endemic to Victoria in Australia. It is a low, often straggling shrub with egg-shaped leaves with the narrower end towards the base, and mauve to pink and yellow, daisy-like inflorescences.

Description
The upper surface of the leaves is covered with greyish, star-shaped hairs and the lower surface densely covered with woolly, star-shaped hairs.

Taxonomy
Bogong daisy-bush was first formally described in 1889 by Ferdinand von Mueller who gave it the name Aster frostii in The Victorian Naturalist from specimens collect on "Mount Hotham, at an elevation of about ". In 1956, James Hamlyn Willis changed the name to Olearia frostii in the journal Muelleria.

Distribution and habitat
Olearia frostii grows in heath, grassland and woodland on the Bogong High Plains and nearby peaks in north-eastern Victoria.

References

frostii
Flora of Victoria (Australia)
Plants described in 1889
Taxa named by Ferdinand von Mueller